A manuscript (abbreviated MS for singular and MSS for plural) was, traditionally, any document written by hand or typewritten, as opposed to mechanically printed or reproduced in some indirect or automated way. More recently, the term has come to be understood to further include any written, typed, or word-processed copy of an author's work, as distinguished from the rendition as a printed version of the same.

Before the arrival of prints, all documents and books were manuscripts. Manuscripts are not defined by their contents, which may combine writing with mathematical calculations, maps, music notation, explanatory figures, or illustrations.

Terminology

The study of the writing in surviving manuscripts, the "hand", is termed palaeography (or paleography). The traditional abbreviations are MS for manuscript and MSS for manuscripts, while the forms MS., ms or ms. for singular, and MSS., mss or mss. for plural (with or without the full stop, all uppercase or all lowercase) are also accepted. The second s is not simply the plural; by an old convention, a doubling of the last letter of the abbreviation expresses the plural, just as pp. means "pages".

A manuscript may be a codex (i.e. bound as a book) or a scroll. Illuminated manuscripts are enriched with pictures, border decorations, elaborately embossed initial letters or full-page illustrations.

Parts
 Cover
 Flyleaf (blank sheet)
 Colophon (publication information)
 incipit (the first few words of the text)
 decoration; illustrations
 dimensions
 Shelfmark or Signature in holding library (as opposed to printed Catalog number)
 works/compositions included in same ms
 codicological elements:
 deletions method: erasure? overstrike? dots above letters?
 headers/footers
 page format/layout: columns? text and surrounding commentary/additions/glosses?
 interpolations (passage not written by the original author)
 owners' marginal notations/corrections
 owner signatures
 dedication/inscription
 censor signatures
 collation (quires) (binding order)
 foliation
 page numeration
 binding
 manuscripts bound together in a single volume:
 convolute: volume containing different manuscripts
 fascicle: individual manuscript, part of a convolute

Materials
 paper
 parchment
 papyrus
 ink
 writing implement used
 pencil
 pastedown (blank paper for inside cover)

Paleographic elements 
 script (one or more)
 dating
 line fillers
 rubrication (red ink text)
 ruled lines
 catchwords
 historical elements of the ms: blood, wine etc. stains
 condition:
 smokiness
 evidence of fire
 mold
 wormed

Reproduction

The mechanical reproduction of a manuscript is called facsimile. Digital reproductions can be called (high-resolution) scans or digital images.

History

Before the inventions of printing, in China by woodblock and in Europe by movable type in a printing press, all written documents had to be both produced and reproduced by hand. Historically, manuscripts were produced in form of scrolls (volumen in Latin) or books (codex, plural codices). Manuscripts were produced on vellum and other parchment, on papyrus, and on paper. In Russia birch bark documents as old as from the 11th century have survived. In India, the palm leaf manuscript, with a distinctive long rectangular shape, was used from ancient times until the 19th century.

Paper spread from China via the Islamic world to Europe by the 14th century, and by the late 15th century had largely replaced parchment for many purposes. When Greek or Latin works were published, numerous professional copies were made simultaneously by scribes in a scriptorium, each making a single copy from an original that was declaimed aloud.

The oldest written manuscripts have been preserved by the perfect dryness of their Middle Eastern resting places, whether placed within sarcophagi in Egyptian tombs, or reused as mummy-wrappings, discarded in the middens of Oxyrhynchus or secreted for safe-keeping in jars and buried (Nag Hammadi library) or stored in dry caves (Dead Sea scrolls). Manuscripts in Tocharian languages, written on palm leaves, survived in desert burials in the Tarim Basin of Central Asia. Volcanic ash preserved some of the Roman library of the Villa of the Papyri in Herculaneum.

Ironically, the manuscripts that were being most carefully preserved in the libraries of antiquity are virtually all lost. Papyrus has a life of at most a century or two in relatively moist Italian or Greek conditions; only those works copied onto parchment, usually after the general conversion to Christianity, have survived, and by no means all of those.

Originally, all books were in manuscript form. In China, and later other parts of East Asia, woodblock printing was used for books from about the 7th century. The earliest dated example is the Diamond Sutra of 868. In the Islamic world and the West, all books were in manuscript until the introduction of movable type printing in about 1450. Manuscript copying of books continued for a least a century, as printing remained expensive. Private or government documents remained hand-written until the invention of the typewriter in the late 19th century. Because of the likelihood of errors being introduced each time a manuscript was copied, the filiation of different versions of the same text is a fundamental part of the study and criticism of all texts that have been transmitted in manuscript.

In Southeast Asia, in the first millennium, documents of sufficiently great importance were inscribed on soft metallic sheets such as copperplate, softened by refiner's fire and inscribed with a metal stylus. In the Philippines, for example, as early as 900 AD, specimen documents were not inscribed by stylus, but were punched much like the style of today's dot-matrix printers. This type of document was rare compared to the usual leaves and bamboo staves that were inscribed. However, neither the leaves nor paper were as durable as the metal document in the hot, humid climate. In Burma, the kammavaca, Buddhist manuscripts, were inscribed on brass, copper or ivory sheets, and even on discarded monk robes folded and lacquered. In Italy some important Etruscan texts were similarly inscribed on thin gold plates: similar sheets have been discovered in Bulgaria. Technically, these are all inscriptions rather than manuscripts.

In the Western world, from the classical period through the early centuries of the Christian era, manuscripts were written without spaces between the words (scriptio continua), which makes them especially hard for the untrained to read. Extant copies of these early manuscripts written in Greek or Latin and usually dating from the 4th century to the 8th century, are classified according to their use of either all upper case or all lower case letters. Hebrew manuscripts, such as the Dead Sea scrolls make no such differentiation. Manuscripts using all upper case letters are called majuscule, those using all lower case are called minuscule. Usually, the majuscule scripts such as uncial are written with much more care. The scribe lifted his pen between each stroke, producing an unmistakable effect of regularity and formality. On the other hand, while minuscule scripts can be written with pen-lift, they may also be cursive, that is, use little or no pen-lift.

Islamic world 

Islamic manuscripts were produced in different ways depending on their use and time period. Parchment (vellum) was a common way to produce manuscripts. Manuscripts eventually transitioned to using paper in later centuries with the diffusion of paper making in the Islamic empire. When Muslims encountered paper in Central Asia, its use and production spread to Iran, Iraq, Syria, Egypt, and North Africa during the 8th century.

Africa 
In present-day Mali, about 250,000 old manuscripts from the Timbuktu libraries survive.

According to National Geographic, around 700,000 manuscripts in Timbuktu alone has survived.

Approximately 1 million manuscripts have since managed to survive from the northern edges of Guinea and Ghana to the shores of the Mediterranean.

Western world 

Most surviving pre-modern manuscripts use the codex format (as in a modern book), which had replaced the scroll by Late Antiquity. Parchment or vellum, as the best type of parchment is known, had also replaced papyrus, which was not nearly so long lived and has survived to the present only in the extremely dry conditions of Egypt, although it was widely used across the Roman world. Parchment is made of animal skin, normally calf, sheep, or goat, but also other animals. With all skins, the quality of the finished product is based on how much preparation and skill was put into turning the skin into parchment. Parchment made from calf or sheep was the most common in Northern Europe, while civilizations in Southern Europe preferred goatskin. Often, if the parchment is white or cream in color and veins from the animal can still be seen, it is calfskin. If it is yellow, greasy or in some cases shiny, then it was made from sheepskin.

For a step-by step process of how these books were prepared, including copying and illumination, watch this video provided by the Getty Museum.

Vellum comes from the Latin word vitulinum which means "of calf"/ "made from calf". For modern parchment makers and calligraphers, and apparently often in the past, the terms parchment and vellum are used based on the different degrees of quality, preparation and thickness, and not according to which animal the skin came from, and because of this, the more neutral term "membrane" is often used by modern academics, especially where the animal has not been established by testing.

Because they are books, pre-modern manuscripts are best described using bibliographic rather than archival standards. The standard endorsed by the American Library Association is known as AMREMM. A growing digital catalog of pre-modern manuscripts is Digital Scriptorium, hosted by the University of California at Berkeley.

Scripts
Merovingian script, or "Luxeuil minuscule", is named after an abbey in Western France, the Luxeuil Abbey, founded by the Irish missionary St Columba ca. 590. Caroline minuscule is a calligraphic script developed as a writing standard in Europe so that the Latin alphabet could be easily recognized by the literate class from different regions. It was used in the Holy Roman Empire between approximately 800 and 1200. Codices, classical and Christian texts, and educational material were written in Carolingian minuscule throughout the Carolingian Renaissance. The script developed into blackletter and became obsolete, though its revival in the Italian renaissance forms the basis of more recent scripts. In Introduction to Manuscript Studies, Clemens and Graham associate the beginning of this text coming from the Abby of Saint-Martin at Tours.

Caroline Minuscule arrived in England in the second half of the 10th century. Its adoption there, replacing Insular script, was encouraged by the importation of continental European manuscripts by Saints Dunstan, Aethelwold, and Oswald. This script spread quite rapidly, being employed in many English centres for copying Latin texts. English scribes adapted the Carolingian script, giving it proportion and legibility. This new revision of the Caroline minuscule was called English Protogothic Bookhand.
Another script that is derived from the Caroline Minuscule was the German Protogothic Bookhand. It originated in southern Germany during the second half of the 12th century.
All the individual letters are Caroline; but just as with English Protogothic Bookhand it evolved. This can be seen most notably in the arm of the letter h. It has a hairline that tapers out by curving to the left. When first read the German Protogothic h looks like the German Protogothic b. Many more scripts sprang out of the German Protogothic Bookhand. After those came Bastard Anglicana, which is best described as:
The coexistence in the Gothic period of formal hands employed for the copying of books and cursive scripts used for documentary purposes eventually resulted in cross-fertilization between these two fundamentally different writing styles. Notably, scribes began to upgrade some of the cursive scripts. A script that has been thus formalized is known as a bastard script (whereas a bookhand that has had cursive elements fused onto it is known as a hybrid script). The advantage of such a script was that it could be written more quickly than a pure bookhand; it thus recommended itself to scribes in a period when demand for books was increasing and authors were tending to write longer texts. In England during the fourteenth and fifteenth centuries, many books were written in the script known as Bastard Anglicana.

Genres 
From ancient texts to medieval maps, anything written down for study would have been done with manuscripts. Some of the most common genres were bibles, religious commentaries, philosophy, law and government texts.

Biblical
"The Bible was the most studied book of the Middle Ages". The Bible was the center of medieval religious life. Along with the Bible came scores of commentaries. Commentaries were written in volumes, with some focusing on just single pages of scripture. Across Europe, there were universities that prided themselves on their biblical knowledge. Along with universities, certain cities also had their own celebrities of biblical knowledge during the medieval period.

Book of hours

A book of hours is a type of devotional text which was widely popular during the Middle Ages. They are the most common type of surviving medieval illuminated manuscripts. Each book of hours contain a similar collection of texts, prayers, and psalms but decoration can vary between each and each example. Many have minimal illumination, often restricted to ornamented initials, but books of hours made for wealthier patrons can be extremely extravagant with full-page miniatures. These books were used for owners to recite prayers privately eight different times, or hours, of the day.

Liturgical books and calendars

Along with Bibles, large numbers of manuscripts made in the Middle Ages were received in Church. Due to the complex church system of rituals and worship these books were the most elegantly written and finely decorated of all medieval manuscripts. Liturgical books usually came in two varieties. Those used during mass and those for divine office.

Most liturgical books came with a calendar in the front. This served as a quick reference point for important dates in Jesus' life and to tell church officials which saints were to be honored and on what day.

Modern variations
In the context of library science, a manuscript is defined as any hand-written item in the collections of a library or an archive. For example, a library's collection of hand-written letters or diaries is considered a manuscript collection. Such manuscript collections are described in finding aids, similar to an index or table of contents to the collection, in accordance with national and international content standards such as DACS and ISAD(G).

In other contexts, however, the use of the term "manuscript" no longer necessarily means something that is hand-written. By analogy a typescript has been produced on a typewriter.

Publishing

In book, magazine, and music publishing, a manuscript is an autograph or copy of a work, written by an author, composer or copyist. Such manuscripts generally follow standardized typographic and formatting rules, in which case they can be called fair copy (whether original or copy). The staff paper commonly used for handwritten music is, for this reason, often called "manuscript paper".

Film and theatre

In film and theatre, a manuscript, or script for short, is an author's or dramatist's text, used by a theatre company or film crew during the production of the work's performance or filming. More specifically, a motion picture manuscript is called a screenplay; a television manuscript, a teleplay; a manuscript for the theatre, a stage play; and a manuscript for audio-only performance is often called a radio play, even when the recorded performance is disseminated via non-radio means.

Insurance

In insurance, a manuscript policy is one that is negotiated between the insurer and the policyholder, as opposed to an off-the-shelf form supplied by the insurer.

Preservation 
About 300,000 Latin, 55,000 Greek, 30,000 Armenian and 12,000 Georgian medieval manuscripts have survived.

Repositories
Major U.S. repositories of medieval manuscripts include:
 The Morgan Library & Museum = 1,300 (including papyri)
 Beinecke Rare Book and Manuscript Library, Yale = 1,100
 Walters Art Museum = 1,000
 Houghton Library, Harvard = 850
 Van Pelt Library, Penn = 650
 Huntington Library = 400
 Robbins Collection = 300
 Newberry Library = 260
 Cornell University Library = 150

Many European libraries have far larger collections.
 British Library#Collections of manuscripts

See also

Examples

General 

 
 
 
 Digital Scriptorium: a consortium of American libraries
 Genkō yōshi: a kind of ruled paper preprinted with squares

References

External links

 British Library Glossary of manuscript terms, mostly relating to Western medieval manuscripts
 Centre for the Studies of Manuscript Cultures, Hamburg
 Centre for the History of the Book, University of Edinburgh
 Chinese Codicology
 Digital Scriptorium
 Shapell Manuscript Foundation
 Manuscripts Department, University of North Carolina at Chapel Hill
 The Sarasvati Mahal Library, has the richest collection of manuscripts in Sanskrit, Tamil, Marathi and Telugu
 The Schøyen Collection – the world's largest private collection of manuscripts of all types, with many descriptions and images
 
 Newberry Library Manuscript Search 
 Getty Exhibitions
 Polish manuscripts in Sweden
 Medieval Manuscript Leaves, University of Colorado Boulder Libraries
 Manuscripts of Lichfield Cathedral – Digital facsimile of the 8th-century St Chad Gospels and Cathedral's 15th-century Wycliffe New Testament, 2010. Includes the ability to overlay images captured with 13 different bands of light, historical images (starting in 1887), and multispectral visualizations. Also includes sixteen interactive 3D renderings. College of Arts & Sciences, University of Kentucky
 Historical Image Overlays – See how an early medieval manuscript is aging
 Introduction to codicology : Hebrew, Greek, Latin, Roman and Arabic Mss by Philippe Bobichon

 
Book terminology
Textual criticism
Textual scholarship
Fiction forms
Copying